The United Nations United States Council of Organizations, or Council of Organizations is a body dedicated to supporting the United Nations. The council is closely affiliated with the United Nations Association of the United States of America, the United Nations Foundation, and the UNA-USA National Council.

History 
Established in 1947, the council advocates for US leadership at the UN, connects the mission and work of the UN to schools and communities across the US, and works with a wide range of partners to advance the UN's Sustainable Development Goals. The committee is composed of representatives from across the United States representing educational, nonprofit, business, and civic organizations.

See also 

 United Nations Foundation
 United Nations

References 

World Federation of United Nations Associations
United States and the United Nations
Organizations established in 1947